Randia, commonly known as indigoberry, is a mostly Neotropical genus of shrubs or small trees in the Rubiaceae.  Plants of the World Online lists a total of 112 accepted species in the genus. Several Australian species have been reassigned to the genus Atractocarpus. These include the garden plants Atractocarpus chartaceus and A. fitzalanii.

Carl Linnaeus retained the name Randia, applied by Houston to commemorate Isaac Rand.

Species of this genus are generally dioecious, with separate male and female plants, although exceptions exist. They are trees, shrubs, and lianas, and may be deciduous or evergreen.

Selected species

Formerly placed here
Atractocarpus benthamianus  (as R. benthamiana )
Atractocarpus carolinensis  (as R. carolinensis )
Atractocarpus chartaceus (F.Muell.) Puttock (as R. chartacea (F.Muell.) F.Muell.)
Atractocarpus crosbyi  (as R. crosbyi )
Atractocarpus decorus  (as R. decora )
Atractocarpus fitzalanii  (as R. fitzalanii )Atractocarpus hirtus  (as R. hirta )Atractocarpus macarthurii  (as R. macarthurii )Atractocarpus sessilis  (as R. sessilis )Atractocarpus stipularis  (as Randia stipularis )Atractocarpus tahitiensis  (as R. tahitiensis  )Atractocarpus tenuiflorus  (as R. tenuiflora )Atractocarpus versteegii  (as R. versteegii )Aidia cochinchinensis Lour. (as R. henryi E.Pritz. or R. cochinchinensis (Lour.) Merr.)Aidia genipiflora (DC.) Dandy (as R. genipiflora DC.) Benkara malabarica (Lam.) Tirveng. (as R. malabarica Lam.) Benkara sinensis (Lour.) Ridsdale (as R. sinensis (Lour.) Schult.)Catunaregam spinosa (Thunb.) Tirveng. (as R. dumetorum (Retz.) Poir. or R. spinosa (Thunb.) Poir.) Catunaregam tomentosa (Blume ex DC.) Tirveng. (as R. tomentosa (Blume ex DC.) Hook.f.)Coddia rudis (E.Mey. ex Harv.) Verdc. (as R. rudis E. Mey. ex Harv.)Porterandia penduliflora (K.Schum.) Keay (as R. penduliflora K.Schum. or R. sericantha K.Schum. ex Engl.)Rosenbergiodendron formosum (Jacq.) Fagerl. (as R. formosa (Jacq.) K.Schum. or R. mussaenda (L.f.) DC.)Rosenbergiodendron longiflorum (Ruiz & Pav.) Fagerl. (as R. ruiziana DC.)Rothmannia longiflora Salisb. (as R. maculata DC.)Rothmannia whitfieldii (Lindl.) Dandy (as R. malleifera (Hook.) Benth. & Hook.f.)Tamilnadia uliginosa (Retz.) Tirveng. & Sastre (as R. uliginosa'' (Retz.) Poir.)

References

External links
Randia at the USDA PLANTS database.

 
Rubiaceae genera
Dioecious plants